Poduene Glacier is the 3.3 km long and 2.4 km wide glacier on Pefaur (Ventimiglia) Peninsula, Danco Coast on the west side of Antarctic Peninsula, situated west of Agalina Glacier.  It drains the north slopes of Mount Zeppelin, and flows northwestwards into Gerlache Strait east of Eckener Point.

The glacier is named after the settlement of Poduene in Western Bulgaria, now part of the city of Sofia.

Location
British mapping in 1978.

Maps
 British Antarctic Territory.  Scale 1:200000 topographic map. DOS 610 Series, Sheet W 64 60.  Directorate of Overseas Surveys, Tolworth, UK, 1978.
 Antarctic Digital Database (ADD). Scale 1:250000 topographic map of Antarctica. Scientific Committee on Antarctic Research (SCAR), 1993–2016.

References
 Bulgarian Antarctic Gazetteer. Antarctic Place-names Commission. (details in Bulgarian, basic data in English)
 Poduene Glacier. SCAR Composite Gazetteer of Antarctica

External links
 Poduene Glacier. Copernix satellite image

Bulgaria and the Antarctic
Glaciers of Danco Coast